Imri or Imry may refer to:

In the Hebrew Bible
Imri (biblical figure), two individuals mentioned in the Old Testament

Other

Imri Ganiel (born 1992), Israeli swimmer
Imri Kalmann (born 1986), Israeli social activist and former co-chairperson of the Israeli LGBT Association
Imri Ziv, also known as IMRI, Israeli singer and voice actor. After winning HaKokhav HaBa, he represented Israel in the Eurovision Song Contest 2017 in Kiev
Yoseph Imry (1939–2018), Israeli physicist

See also
IMRIS